Barbers Point Light is a lighthouse on the island of Oahu in Hawaii. The lighthouse stands on Barbers Point outside of Kalaeloa on the southwest tip of the island. It is named after Captain Henry Barber. The lighthouse was established in 1888. A second tower was built in 1933.

Keepers
 William Hatton Aalona 1888 – 1907
 Isaac Kalua 1907
 Harry Gregson 1907 – 1909
 William F. Williams 1909
 Samuel Apolo Amalu 1909 – 1913
 Robert I. Reid 1913 – 1916
 Manuel Ferreira 1916 – 1925
 Charles K. Akana 1925 – 1929
 Samuel Apolo Amalu 1929 – 1941
 John M. Sweeney 1941
 Manuel Ferreira 1942 – 1944
 Fred E. Robins, Sr. 1953 – 1964

See also
List of lighthouses in Hawaii

Notes

References

External links
 

Lighthouses completed in 1888
Lighthouses completed in 1933
Lighthouses on the National Register of Historic Places in Hawaii
Buildings and structures in Honolulu County, Hawaii
1888 establishments in Hawaii
National Register of Historic Places in Honolulu County, Hawaii